Tauanui is a 351 m high basaltic scoria cone in the Kaikohe-Bay of Islands volcanic field in New Zealand. It is the youngest volcano of the field, having erupted around 60,000 years ago, and also the southernmost of the group. South of the scoria cone is Lake Tauanui. To the northwest of Tauanui is a smaller scoria cone, Hangunui Pā.

References

Geological Society of New Zealand

Volcanoes of the Northland Region
Far North District